The history of fascist ideology is long and it draws on many sources. Fascists took inspiration from sources as ancient as the Spartans for their focus on racial purity and their emphasis on rule by an elite minority. Fascism has also been connected to the ideals of Plato, though there are key differences between the two. Fascism styled itself as the ideological successor to Rome, particularly the Roman Empire. From the same era, Georg Wilhelm Friedrich Hegel's view on the absolute authority of the state also strongly influenced fascist thinking. The French Revolution was a major influence insofar as the Nazis saw themselves as fighting back against many of the ideas which it brought to prominence, especially liberalism, liberal democracy and racial equality, whereas on the other hand, fascism drew heavily on the revolutionary ideal of nationalism. The prejudice of a "high and noble" Aryan culture as opposed to a "parasitic" Semitic culture was core to Nazi racial views, while other early forms of fascism concerned themselves with non-racialized conceptions of the nation.

Common themes among fascist movements include: authoritarianism, nationalism (including racial nationalism), hierarchy and elitism, and militarism. Other aspects of fascism such as its "myth of decadence", anti-egalitarianism and totalitarianism can be seen to originate from these ideas. Roger Griffin has proposed that fascism is a synthesis of totalitarianism and ultranationalism sacralized through a myth of national rebirth and regeneration, which he terms "Palingenetic ultranationalism".

Fascism's relationship with other ideologies of its day has been complex. It frequently considered those ideologies its adversaries, but at the same time it was also focused on co-opting their more popular aspects. Fascism supported private property rights – except for the groups which it persecuted – and the profit motive of capitalism, but it sought to eliminate the autonomy of large-scale capitalism from the state. Fascists shared many of the goals of the conservatives of their day and they often allied themselves with them by drawing recruits from disaffected conservative ranks, but they presented themselves as holding a more modern ideology, with less focus on things like traditional religion, and sought to radically reshape society through revolutionary action rather than preserve the status quo. Fascism opposed class conflict and the egalitarian and international character of socialism. It strongly opposed liberalism, communism, anarchism, and democratic socialism.

Ideological origins

Early influences (495 BCE–1880 CE)

Early influences that shaped the ideology of fascism have been dated back to Ancient Greece. The political culture of ancient Greece and specifically the ancient Greek city state of Sparta under Lycurgus, with its emphasis on militarism and racial purity, were admired by the Nazis. Nazi Führer Adolf Hitler emphasized that Germany should adhere to Hellenic values and culture – particularly that of ancient Sparta. He rebuked potential criticism of Hellenic values being non-German by emphasizing the common Aryan race connection with ancient Greeks, saying in Mein Kampf: "One must not allow the differences of the individual races to tear up the greater racial community". In fact, drawing racial ties to ancient Greek culture was seen as necessary to the national narrative, as Hitler was unimpressed with the cultural works of Germanic tribes at the time, saying, "if anyone asks us about our ancestors, we should continually allude to the ancient Greeks."

Hitler went on to say in Mein Kampf: "The struggle that rages today involves very great aims: a culture fights for its existence, which combines millenniums and embraces Hellenism and Germanity together". The Spartans were emulated by the quasi-fascist regime of Ioannis Metaxas who called for Greeks to wholly commit themselves to the nation with self-control as the Spartans had done. Supporters of the 4th of August Regime in the 1930s to 1940s justified the dictatorship of Metaxas on the basis that the "First Greek Civilization" involved an Athenian dictatorship led by Pericles who had brought ancient Greece to greatness. The Greek philosopher Plato supported many similar political positions to fascism. In The Republic (c. 380 BC), Plato emphasizes the need for a philosopher king in an ideal state. Plato believed the ideal state would be ruled by an elite class of rulers known as "Guardians" and rejected the idea of social equality. Plato believed in an authoritarian state. Plato held Athenian democracy in contempt by saying: "The laws of democracy remain a dead letter, its freedom is anarchy, its equality the equality of unequals". Like fascism, Plato emphasized that individuals must adhere to laws and perform duties while declining to grant individuals rights to limit or reject state interference in their lives. Like fascism, Plato also claimed that an ideal state would have state-run education that was designed to promote able rulers and warriors. Like many fascist ideologues, Plato advocated for a state-sponsored eugenics program to be carried out in order to improve the Guardian class in his Republic through selective breeding. Italian Fascist Il Duce Benito Mussolini had a strong attachment to the works of Plato. However, there are significant differences between Plato's ideals and fascism. Unlike fascism, Plato never promoted expansionism and he was opposed to offensive war.

Italian Fascists identified their ideology as being connected to the legacy of ancient Rome and particularly the Roman Empire: they idolized Julius Caesar and Augustus. Italian Fascism viewed the modern state of Italy as the heir of the Roman Empire and emphasized the need for renovation of Italian culture to "return to Roman values". Italian Fascists identified the Roman Empire as being an ideal organic and stable society in contrast to contemporary individualist liberal society that they saw as being chaotic in comparison. Julius Caesar was considered a role model by fascists because he led a revolution that overthrew an old order to establish a new order based on a dictatorship in which he wielded absolute power. Mussolini emphasized the need for dictatorship, activist leadership style and a leader cult like that of Julius Caesar that involved "the will to fix a unifying and balanced centre and a common will to action". Italian Fascists also idolized Augustus as the champion who built the Roman Empire. The fasces – a symbol of Roman authority – was the symbol of the Italian Fascists and was additionally adopted by many other national fascist movements formed in emulation of Italian Fascism. While a number of Nazis rejected Roman civilization because they saw it as incompatible with Aryan Germanic culture and they also believed that Aryan Germanic culture was outside Roman culture, Adolf Hitler personally admired ancient Rome. Hitler focused on ancient Rome during its rise to dominance and at the height of its power as a model to follow, and he deeply admired the Roman Empire for its ability to forge a strong and unified civilization. In private conversations, Hitler blamed the fall of the Roman Empire on the Roman adoption of Christianity because he claimed that Christianity authorized the racial intermixing that weakened Rome and led to its destruction.

There were a number of influences on fascism from the Renaissance era in Europe. Niccolò Machiavelli is known to have influenced Italian Fascism, particularly through his promotion of the absolute authority of the state. Machiavelli rejected all existing traditional and metaphysical assumptions of the time—especially those associated with the Middle Ages—and asserted as an Italian patriot that Italy needed a strong and all-powerful state led by a vigorous and ruthless leader who would conquer and unify Italy. Mussolini saw himself as a modern-day Machiavellian and wrote an introduction to his honorary doctoral thesis for the University of Bologna—"Prelude to Machiavelli". Mussolini professed that Machiavelli's "pessimism about human nature was eternal in its acuity. Individuals simply could not be relied on voluntarily to 'obey the law, pay their taxes and serve in war'. No well-ordered society could want the people to be sovereign". Most dictators of the 20th century mimicked Mussolini's admiration for Machiavelli and "Stalin... saw himself as the embodiment of Machiavellian virtù".

English political theorist Thomas Hobbes in his work Leviathan (1651) created the ideology of absolutism that advocated an all-powerful absolute monarchy to maintain order within a state. Absolutism was an influence on fascism. Absolutism based its legitimacy on the precedents of Roman law including the centralized Roman state and the manifestation of Roman law in the Catholic Church. Though fascism supported the absolute power of the state, it opposed the idea of absolute power being in the hands of a monarch and opposed the feudalism that was associated with absolute monarchies.

During the Enlightenment, a number of ideological influences arose that would shape the development of fascism. The development of the study of universal histories by Johann Gottfried Herder resulted in Herder's analysis of the development of nations. Herder developed the term Nationalismus ("nationalism") to describe this cultural phenomenon. At this time nationalism did not refer to the political ideology of nationalism that was later developed during the French Revolution. Herder also developed the theory that Europeans are the descendants of Indo-Aryan people based on language studies. Herder argued that the Germanic peoples held close racial connections with the ancient Indians and ancient Persians, who he claimed were advanced peoples possessing a great capacity for wisdom, nobility, restraint and science. Contemporaries of Herder used the concept of the Aryan race to draw a distinction between what they deemed "high and noble" Aryan culture versus that of "parasitic" Semitic culture and this anti-Semitic variant view of Europeans' Aryan roots formed the basis of Nazi racial views. Another major influence on fascism came from the political theories of Georg Wilhelm Friedrich Hegel. Hegel promoted the absolute authority of the state and said "nothing short of the state is the actualization of freedom" and that the "state is the march of God on earth".

The French Revolution and its political legacy had a major influence upon the development of fascism. Fascists view the French Revolution as a largely negative event that resulted in the entrenchment of liberal ideas such as liberal democracy, anticlericalism and rationalism. Opponents of the French Revolution initially were conservatives and reactionaries, but the Revolution was also later criticized by Marxists for its bourgeois character, and by racist nationalists who opposed its universalist principles. Racist nationalists in particular condemned the French Revolution for granting social equality to "inferior races" such as Jews. Mussolini condemned the French Revolution for developing liberalism, scientific socialism and liberal democracy, but also acknowledged that fascism extracted and used all the elements that had preserved those ideologies' vitality and that fascism had no desire to restore the conditions that precipitated the French Revolution. Though fascism opposed core parts of the Revolution, fascists supported other aspects of it, Mussolini declared his support for the Revolution's demolishment of remnants of the Middle Ages such as tolls and compulsory labour upon citizens and he noted that the French Revolution did have benefits in that it had been a cause of the whole French nation and not merely a political party. Most importantly, the French Revolution was responsible for the entrenchment of nationalism as a political ideology – both in its development in France as French nationalism and in the creation of nationalist movements particularly in Germany with the development of German nationalism by Johann Gottlieb Fichte as a political response to the development of French nationalism. The Nazis accused the French Revolution of being dominated by Jews and Freemasons and were deeply disturbed by the Revolution's intention to completely break France away from its history in what the Nazis claimed was a repudiation of history that they asserted to be a trait of the Enlightenment. Though the Nazis were highly critical of the Revolution, Hitler in Mein Kampf said that the French Revolution is a model for how to achieve change that he claims was caused by the rhetorical strength of demagogues. Furthermore, the Nazis idealized the levée en masse (mass mobilization of soldiers) that was developed by French Revolutionary armies and the Nazis sought to use the system for their paramilitary movement.

Fin de siècle era and the fusion of nationalism with Sorelianism (1880–1914)

The ideological roots of fascism have been traced to the 1880s and in particular the fin de siècle theme of that time. The theme was based on revolt against materialism, rationalism, positivism, bourgeois society and liberal democracy. The fin-de-siècle generation supported emotionalism, irrationalism, subjectivism and vitalism. The fin-de-siècle mindset saw civilization as being in a crisis that required a massive and total solution. The fin-de-siècle intellectual school of the 1890s – including Gabriele d'Annunzio and Enrico Corradini in Italy; Maurice Barrès, Edouard Drumont and Georges Sorel in France; and Paul de Lagarde, Julius Langbehn and Arthur Moeller van den Bruck in Germany – saw social and political collectivity as more important than individualism and rationalism. They considered the individual as only one part of the larger collectivity, which should not be viewed as an atomized numerical sum of individuals. They condemned the rationalistic individualism of liberal society and the dissolution of social links in bourgeois society. They saw modern society as one of mediocrity, materialism, instability, and corruption. They denounced big-city urban society as being merely based on instinct and animality and without heroism.

The fin-de-siècle outlook was influenced by various intellectual developments, including Darwinian biology; Wagnerian aesthetics; Arthur de Gobineau's racialism; Gustave Le Bon's psychology; and the philosophies of Friedrich Nietzsche, Fyodor Dostoyevsky and Henri Bergson. Social Darwinism, which gained widespread acceptance, made no distinction between physical and social life and viewed the human condition as being an unceasing struggle to achieve the survival of the fittest. Social Darwinism challenged positivism's claim of deliberate and rational choice as the determining behaviour of humans, with social Darwinism focusing on heredity, race and environment. Social Darwinism's emphasis on biogroup identity and the role of organic relations within societies fostered legitimacy and appeal for nationalism. New theories of social and political psychology also rejected the notion of human behaviour being governed by rational choice, and instead claimed that emotion was more influential in political issues than reason. Nietzsche's argument that "God is dead" coincided with his attack on the "herd mentality" of Christianity, democracy and modern collectivism; his concept of the Übermensch; and his advocacy of the will to power as a primordial instinct were major influences upon many of the fin-de-siècle generation. Bergson's claim of the existence of an "élan vital" or vital instinct centred upon free choice and rejected the processes of materialism and determinism, thus challenged Marxism.

With the advent of the Darwinian theory of evolution came claims of evolution possibly leading to decadence. Proponents of decadence theories claimed that contemporary Western society's decadence was the result of modern life, including urbanization, sedentary lifestyle, the survival of the least fit and modern culture's emphasis on egalitarianism, individualistic anomie, and nonconformity. The main work that gave rise to decadence theories was the work Degeneration (1892) by Max Nordau that was popular in Europe, the ideas of decadence helped the cause of nationalists who presented nationalism as a cure for decadence.

Gaetano Mosca in his work The Ruling Class (1896) developed the theory that claims that in all societies, an "organized minority" will dominate and rule over the "disorganized majority". Mosca claims that there are only two classes in society, "the governing" (the organized minority) and "the governed" (the disorganized majority). He claims that the organized nature of the organized minority makes it irresistible to any individual of the disorganized majority. Mosca developed this theory in 1896 in which he argued that the problem of the supremacy of civilian power in society is solved in part by the presence and social structural design of militaries. He claims that the social structure of the military is ideal because it includes diverse social elements that balance each other out and more importantly is its inclusion of an officer class as a "power elite". Mosca presented the social structure and methods of governance by the military as a valid model of development for civil society. Mosca's theories are known to have significantly influenced Mussolini's notion of the political process and fascism.

Related to Mosca's theory of domination of society by an organized minority over a disorganized majority was Robert Michels' theory of the iron law of oligarchy, created in 1911, which was a major attack on the basis of contemporary democracy. Michels argues that oligarchy is inevitable as an "iron law" within any organization as part of the "tactical and technical necessities" of organization and on the topic of democracy, Michels stated: "It is organization which gives birth to the dominion of the elected over the electors, of the mandataries over the mandators, of the delegates over the delegators. Who says organization, says oligarchy". He claims: "Historical evolution mocks all the prophylactic measures that have been adopted for the prevention of oligarchy". He states that the official goal of contemporary democracy of eliminating elite rule was impossible, that democracy is a façade which legitimizes the rule of a particular elite and that elite rule, which he refers to as oligarchy, is inevitable. Michels had previously been a social democrat, but became drawn to the ideas of Georges Sorel, Édouard Berth, Arturo Labriola and Enrico Leone and came to strongly oppose the parliamentarian, legalistic and bureaucratic socialism of social democracy. As early as 1904, he began to advocate in favor of patriotism and national interests. Later he began to support activist, voluntarist, and anti-parliamentarian concepts, and in 1911 he took a position in favor of the Italian war effort in Libya and started moving towards Italian nationalism. Michels eventually became a supporter of fascism upon Mussolini's rise to power in 1922, viewing fascism's goal to destroy liberal democracy in a sympathetic manner.

Maurice Barrès, a French politician of the late 19th and early 20th centuries who influenced the later fascist movement, claimed that true democracy was authoritarian democracy while rejecting liberal democracy as a fraud. Barrès claimed that authoritarian democracy involved a spiritual connection between a leader of a nation and the nation's people, and that true freedom did not arise from individual rights nor parliamentary restraints, but through "heroic leadership" and "national power". He emphasized the need for hero worship and charismatic leadership in national society. Barrès was a founding member of the League for the French Fatherland in 1889, and later coined the term "socialist nationalism" to describe his views during an electoral campaign in 1898. He emphasized class collaboration, the role of intuition and emotion in politics alongside racial Antisemitism, and "he tried to combine the search for energy and a vital style of life with national rootedness and a sort of Darwinian racism." Later in life he returned to cultural traditionalism and parliamentary conservatism, but his ideas contributed to the development of an extremist form of nationalism in pre-1914 France. Other French nationalist intellectuals of the early 20th century also wished to "obliterate the class struggle in ideological terms," ending the threat of communism by persuading working people to identify with their nation rather than their class.

The rise of support for anarchism in this period of time was important in influencing the politics of fascism. The anarchist Mikhail Bakunin's concept of propaganda of the deed, which stressed the importance of direct action as the primary means of politics—including revolutionary violence, became popular amongst fascists who admired the concept and adopted it as a part of fascism.

One of the key persons who greatly influenced fascism was the French intellectual Georges Sorel, who "must be considered one of the least classifiable political thinkers of the twentieth century" and supported a variety of different ideologies throughout his life, including conservatism, socialism, revolutionary syndicalism and nationalism. Sorel also contributed to the fusion of anarchism and syndicalism together into anarcho-syndicalism. He promoted the legitimacy of political violence in his work Reflections on Violence (1908), during a period in his life when he advocated radical syndicalist action to achieve a revolution which would overthrow capitalism and the bourgeoisie through a general strike. In Reflections on Violence, Sorel emphasized need for a revolutionary political religion. Also in his work The Illusions of Progress, Sorel denounced democracy as reactionary, saying "nothing is more aristocratic than democracy". By 1909, after the failure of a syndicalist general strike in France, Sorel and his supporters abandoned the radical left and went to the radical right, where they sought to merge militant Catholicism and French patriotism with their views – advocating anti-republican Christian French patriots as ideal revolutionaries. In the early 1900s Sorel had officially been a revisionist of Marxism, but by 1910 he announced his abandonment of socialism, and in 1914 he claimed – following an aphorism of Benedetto Croce – that "socialism is dead" due to the "decomposition of Marxism". Sorel became a supporter of reactionary Maurrassian integral nationalism beginning in 1909, and this greatly influenced his works.

Sorel's political allegiances were constantly shifting, influencing a variety of people across the political spectrum from Benito Mussolini to Benedetto Croce to Georg Lukács, and both sympathizers and critics of Sorel considered his political thought to be a collection of separate ideas with no coherence and no common thread linking them. In this, Sorelianism is considered to be a precursor to fascism, as fascist thought also drew from disparate sources and did not form a single coherent ideological system. Sorel described himself as "a self-taught man exhibiting to other people the notebooks which have served for my own instruction", and stated that his goal was to be original in all of his writings and that his apparent lack of coherence was due to an unwillingness to write down anything that had already been said elsewhere by someone else. The academic intellectual establishment did not take him seriously, but Mussolini applauded Sorel by declaring: "What I am, I owe to Sorel".

Charles Maurras was a French right-wing monarchist and nationalist who held interest in merging his nationalist ideals with Sorelian syndicalism as a means to confront liberal democracy. This fusion of nationalism from the political right with Sorelian syndicalism from the left took place around the outbreak of World War I. Sorelian syndicalism, unlike other ideologies on the left, held an elitist view that the morality of the working class needed to be raised. The Sorelian concept of the positive nature of social war and its insistence on a moral revolution led some syndicalists to believe that war was the ultimate manifestation of social change and moral revolution.

The fusion of Maurrassian nationalism and Sorelian syndicalism influenced radical Italian nationalist Enrico Corradini. Corradini spoke of the need for a nationalist-syndicalist movement, led by elitist aristocrats and anti-democrats who shared a revolutionary syndicalist commitment to direct action and a willingness to fight. Corradini spoke of Italy as being a "proletarian nation" that needed to pursue imperialism to challenge the "plutocratic" French and British. Corradini's views were part of a wider set of perceptions within the right-wing Italian Nationalist Association (ANI), which claimed that Italy's economic backwardness was caused by corruption in its political class, liberalism, and division caused by "ignoble socialism". The ANI held ties and influence among conservatives, Catholics, and the business community. Italian national syndicalists held a common set of principles: the rejection of bourgeois values, democracy, liberalism, Marxism, internationalism and pacifism and the promotion of heroism, vitalism and violence.

Radical nationalism in Italy—support for expansionism and cultural revolution to create a "New Man" and a "New State"—began to grow in 1912 during the Italian conquest of Libya and was supported by Italian Futurists and members of the ANI. Futurism was both an artistic-cultural movement and initially a political movement in Italy led by Filippo Tommaso Marinetti, the author of the Futurist Manifesto (1908), that championed the causes of modernism, action and political violence as necessary elements of politics while denouncing liberalism and parliamentary politics. Marinetti rejected conventional democracy for being based on majority rule and egalitarianism, while promoting a new form of democracy, that he described in his work "The Futurist Conception of Democracy" as the following: "We are therefore able to give the directions to create and to dismantle to numbers, to quantity, to the mass, for with us number, quantity and mass will never be—as they are in Germany and Russia—the number, quantity and mass of mediocre men, incapable and indecisive". The ANI claimed that liberal democracy was no longer compatible with the modern world and advocated a strong state and imperialism, claiming that humans are naturally predatory and that nations were in a constant struggle, in which only the strongest nations could survive.

Until 1914, Italian nationalists and revolutionary syndicalists with nationalist leanings remained apart. Such syndicalists opposed the Italo-Turkish War of 1911 as an affair of financial interests and not the nation, but World War I was seen by both Italian nationalists and syndicalists as a national affair.

World War I and aftermath (1914–1922)
At the outbreak of World War I in August 1914, the Italian political left became severely split over its position on the war. The Italian Socialist Party opposed the war on the grounds of proletarian internationalism, but a number of Italian revolutionary syndicalists supported intervention in the war on the grounds that it could serve to mobilize the masses against the status quo and that the national question had to be resolved before the social one. Corradini presented the need for Italy as a "proletarian nation" to defeat a reactionary Germany from a nationalist perspective. Angelo Oliviero Olivetti formed the Revolutionary Fascio for International Action in October 1914, to support Italy's entry into the war. At the same time, Benito Mussolini joined the interventionist cause. At first, these interventionist groups were composed of disaffected syndicalists who had concluded that their attempts to promote social change through a general strike had been a failure, and became interested in the transformative potential of militarism and war. They would help to form the Fascist movement several years later.

This early interventionist movement was very small, and did not have an integrated set of policies. Its attempts to hold mass meetings were ineffective and it was regularly harassed by government authorities and socialists. Antagonism between interventionists and socialists resulted in violence. Attacks on interventionists were so violent that even democratic socialists who opposed the war, such as Anna Kuliscioff, said that the Italian Socialist Party had gone too far in its campaign to silence supporters of the war.

Benito Mussolini became prominent within the early pro-war movement thanks to his newspaper, which he founded in November 1914 to support the interventionist cause. The newspaper received funding from the governments of Allied powers that wanted Italy to join them in the war, particularly France and Britain.  was also funded in part by Italian industrialists who hoped to gain financially from the war, including Fiat, other arms manufacturers, and agrarian interests. Mussolini did not have any clear agenda in the beginning other than support for Italy's entry into the war, and sought to appeal to diverse groups of readers. These ranged from dissident socialists who opposed the Socialist Party's anti-war stance, to democratic idealists who believed the war would overthrow autocratic monarchies across Europe, to Italian patriots who wanted to recover ethnic Italian territories from Austria, to imperialists who dreamed of a new Roman Empire.

By early 1915, Mussolini had moved towards the nationalist position. He began arguing that Italy should conquer Trieste and Fiume, and expand its northeastern border to the Alps, following the ideals of Mazzini who called for a patriotic war to "secure Italy's natural frontiers of language and race". Mussolini also advocated waging a war of conquest in the Balkans and the Middle East, and his supporters began to call themselves . He also started advocating for a "positive attitude" towards capitalism and capitalists, as part of his transition towards supporting class collaboration and an "Italy first" position.

Italy finally entered the war on the Allied side in May 1915. Mussolini later took credit for having allegedly forced the government to declare war on Austria, although his influence on events was minimal. He enrolled into the Royal Italian Army in September 1915 and fought in the war until 1917, when he was wounded during a training exercise and discharged. 
The  were soldiers who were specifically trained for a life of violence and wore unique blackshirt uniforms and fezzes.

A major event that greatly influenced the development of fascism was the October Revolution of 1917, in which Bolshevik communists led by Vladimir Lenin seized power in Russia. The revolution in Russia gave rise to a fear of communism among the elites and among society at large in several European countries, and fascist movements gained support by presenting themselves as a radical anti-communist political force. Anti-communism was also an expression of fascist anti-universalism, as communism insisted on international working class unity while fascism insisted on national interests. In addition, fascist anti-communism was linked to anti-Semitism and even anti-capitalism, because many fascists believed that communism and capitalism were both Jewish creations meant to undermine nation-states. The Nazis advocated the conspiracy theory that Jewish communists were working together with Jewish finance capital against Germany. After World War I, fascists have commonly campaigned on anti-Marxist agendas.

Mussolini's immediate reaction to the Russian Revolution was contradictory. He admired Lenin's boldness in seizing power by force and was envious of the success of the Bolsheviks, while at the same time attacking them in his paper for restricting free speech and creating "a tyranny worse than that of the tsars." At this time, between 1917 and 1919, Mussolini and the early Fascist movement presented themselves as opponents of censorship and champions of free thought and speech, calling these "among the highest expressions of human civilization." Mussolini wrote that "we are libertarians above all" and claimed that the Fascists were committed to "loving liberty for everyone, even for our enemies."

For a brief time in 1919, this early fascist movement tried to position itself as a radical populist alternative to the socialists, offering its own version of a revolutionary transformation of society. In a speech delivered in Milan's Piazza San Sepolcro in March 1919, Mussolini set forward the proposals of the new movement, combining ideas from nationalism, Sorelian syndicalism, the idealism of the French philosopher Henri Bergson, and the theories of Gaetano Mosca and Vilfredo Pareto. Mussolini declared his opposition to Bolshevism because "Bolshevism has ruined the economic life of Russia" and because he claimed that Bolshevism was incompatible with Western civilization; he said that "we declare war against socialism, not because it is socialism, but because it has opposed nationalism", that "we intend to be an active minority, to attract the proletariat away from the official Socialist party" and that "we go halfway toward meeting the workers"; and he declared that "we favor national syndicalism and reject state intervention whenever it aims at throttling the creation of wealth."

In these early post-war years, the Italian Fascist movement tried to become a broad political umbrella that could include all people of all classes and political positions, united only by a desire to save Italy from the Marxist threat and to ensure the expansion of Italian territories in the post-war peace settlements.  wrote in March 1919 that "We allow ourselves the luxury of being aristocrats and democrats, conservatives and progressives, reactionaries and revolutionaries, legalists and antilegalists."

Later in 1919, Alceste De Ambris and futurist movement leader Filippo Tommaso Marinetti created The Manifesto of the Italian Fasci of Combat (also known as the Fascist Manifesto). The Manifesto was presented on 6 June 1919 in the Fascist newspaper . The Manifesto supported the creation of universal suffrage for both men and women (the latter being realized only partly in late 1925, with all opposition parties banned or disbanded); proportional representation on a regional basis; government representation through a corporatist system of "National Councils" of experts, selected from professionals and tradespeople, elected to represent and hold legislative power over their respective areas, including labour, industry, transportation, public health, communications, etc.; and the abolition of the Italian Senate. The Manifesto supported the creation of an eight-hour work day for all workers, a minimum wage, worker representation in industrial management, equal confidence in labour unions as in industrial executives and public servants, reorganization of the transportation sector, revision of the draft law on invalidity insurance, reduction of the retirement age from 65 to 55, a strong progressive tax on capital, confiscation of the property of religious institutions and abolishment of bishoprics and revision of military contracts to allow the government to seize 85% of war profits made by the armaments industry. It also called for the creation of a short-service national militia to serve defensive duties, nationalization of the armaments industry and a foreign policy designed to be peaceful but also competitive. Nevertheless, Mussolini also demanded the expansion of Italian territories, particularly by annexing Dalmatia (which he claimed could be accomplished by peaceful means), and insisted that "the state must confine itself to directing the civil and political life of the nation," which meant taking the government out of business and transferring large segments of the economy from public to private control. The intention was to appeal to a working class electorate while also maintaining the support of business interests, even if this meant making contradictory promises.

With this manifesto, the  campaigned in the Italian elections of November 1919, mostly attempting to take votes away from the socialists. The results were disastrous. The fascists received less than 5000 votes in their political heartland of Milan, compared to 190,000 for the socialists, and not a single fascist candidate was elected to any office. Mussolini's political career seemed to be over. This crippling electoral defeat was largely due to fascism's lack of ideological credibility, as the fascist movement was a mixture of many different ideas and tendencies. It contained monarchists, republicans, syndicalists and conservatives, and some candidates supported the Vatican while others wanted to expel the Pope from Italy. In response to the failure of his electoral strategy, Mussolini shifted his political movement to the right, seeking to form an alliance with the conservatives. Soon, agrarian conflicts in the region of Emilia and in the Po Valley provided an opportunity to launch a series of violent attacks against the socialists, and thus to win credibility with the conservatives and establish fascism as a paramilitary movement rather than an electoral one.

With the antagonism between anti-interventionist Marxists and pro-interventionist Fascists complete by the end of the war, the two sides became irreconcilable. The Fascists presented themselves as anti-Marxists and as opposed to the Marxists. Mussolini tried to build his popular support especially among war veterans and patriots by enthusiastically supporting Gabriele D'Annunzio, the leader of the annexationist faction in post-war Italy, who demanded the annexation of large territories as part of the peace settlement in the aftermath of the war. For D'Annunzio and other nationalists, the city of Fiume in Dalmatia (present-day Croatia) had "suddenly become the symbol of everything sacred." Fiume was a city with an ethnic Italian majority, while the countryside around it was largely ethnic Croatian. Italy demanded the annexation of Fiume and the region around it as a reward for its contribution to the Allied war effort, but the Allies – and US president Woodrow Wilson in particular – intended to give the region to the newly formed Kingdom of Serbs, Croats and Slovenes (later renamed Yugoslavia).

As such, the next events that influenced the Fascists were the raid of Fiume by Italian nationalist Gabriele D'Annunzio and the founding of the Charter of Carnaro in 1920. D'Annunzio and De Ambris designed the Charter, which advocated national-syndicalist corporatist productionism alongside D'Annunzio's political views. Many Fascists saw the Charter of Carnaro as an ideal constitution for a Fascist Italy. This behaviour of aggression towards Yugoslavia and South Slavs was pursued by Italian Fascists with their persecution of South Slavs – especially Slovenes and Croats.

In 1920, militant strike activity by industrial workers reached its peak in Italy, where 1919 and 1920 were known as the "Red Years". Mussolini first supported the strikes, but when this did not help him to gain any additional supporters, he abruptly reversed his position and began to oppose them, seeking financial support from big business and landowners. The donations he received from industrial and agrarian interest groups were unusually large, as they were very concerned about working class unrest and eager to support any political force that stood against it. Together with many smaller donations that he received from the public as part of a fund drive to support D'Annunzio, this helped to build up the Fascist movement and transform it from a small group based around Milan to a national political force. Mussolini organized his own militia, known as the "blackshirts," which started a campaign of violence against Communists, Socialists, trade unions and co-operatives under the pretense of "saving the country from bolshevism" and preserving order and internal peace in Italy. Some of the blackshirts also engaged in armed attacks against the Church, "where several priests were assassinated and churches burned by the Fascists".

At the same time, Mussolini continued to present himself as the champion of Italian national interests and territorial expansion in the Balkans. In the autumn of 1920, Fascist blackshirts in the Italian city of Trieste (located not far from Fiume, and inhabited by Italians as well as Slavs) engaged in street violence and vandalism against Slavs. Mussolini visited the city to support them and was greeted by an enthusiastic crowd – the first time in his political career that he achieved such broad popular support. He also focused his rhetoric on attacks against the liberal government of Giovanni Giolitti, who had withdrawn Italian troops from Albania and did not press the Allies to allow Italy to annex Dalmatia. This helped to draw disaffected former soldiers into the Fascist ranks.

Fascists identified their primary opponents as the socialists on the left who had opposed intervention in World War I. The Fascists and the rest of the Italian political right held common ground: both held Marxism in contempt, discounted class consciousness and believed in the rule of elites. The Fascists assisted the anti-socialist campaign by allying with the other parties and the conservative right in a mutual effort to destroy the Italian Socialist Party and labour organizations committed to class identity above national identity.

In 1921, the radical wing of the Italian Socialist Party broke away to form the Communist Party of Italy. This changed the political landscape, as the remaining Socialist Party – diminished in numbers, but still the largest party in parliament – became more moderate and was therefore seen as a potential coalition partner for Giolitti's government. Such an alliance would have secured a large majority in parliament, ending the political deadlock and making effective government possible. To prevent this from happening, Mussolini offered to ally his Fascists with Giolitti instead, and Giolitti accepted, under the assumption that the small Fascist movement would make fewer demands and would be easier to keep in check than the much larger Socialists.

Mussolini and the Fascists thus joined a coalition formed of conservatives, nationalists and liberals, which stood against the left-wing parties (the socialists and the communists) in the Italian general election of 1921. As part of this coalition, the Fascists – who had previously claimed to be neither left nor right – identified themselves for the first time as the "extreme right", and presented themselves as the most radical right-wing members of the coalition. Mussolini talked about "imperialism" and "national expansion" as his main goals, and called for Italian domination of the Mediterranean Sea basin. The elections of that year were characterized by Fascist street violence and intimidation, which they used to suppress the socialists and communists and to prevent their supporters from voting, while the police and courts (under the control of Giolitti's government) turned a blind eye and allowed the violence to continue without legal consequences. About a hundred people were killed, and some areas of Italy came fully under the control of fascist squads, which did not allow known socialist supporters to vote or hold meetings. In spite of this, the Socialist Party still won the largest share of the vote and 122 seats in parliament, followed by the Catholic  with 107 seats. The Fascists only picked up 7 percent of the vote and 35 seats in parliament, but this was a large improvement compared to their results only two years earlier, when they had won no seats at all. Mussolini took these electoral gains as an indication that his right-wing strategy paid off, and decided that the Fascists would sit on the extreme right side of the amphitheatre where parliament met. He also used his first speech in parliament to take a "reactionary" stance, arguing against collectivization and nationalization, and calling for the post office and the railways to be given to private enterprise.

Prior to Fascism's accommodation of the political right, Fascism was a small, urban, northern Italian movement that had about a thousand members. After Fascism's accommodation of the political right, the Fascist movement's membership soared to approximately 250,000 by 1921.

The other lesson drawn by Mussolini from the events of 1921 was about the effectiveness of open violence and paramilitary groups. The Fascists used violence even in parliament, for example by directly assaulting the communist deputy Misiano and throwing him out of the building on the pretext of having been a deserter during the war. They also openly threatened socialists with their guns in the chamber. They were able to do this with impunity, while the government took no action against them, hoping not to offend Fascist voters. Mussolini claimed that he had "400,000 armed and disciplined men at his command" and did not hide his intentions of seizing power by force.

Rise to power and initial international spread of fascism (1922–1929)
Beginning in 1922, Fascist paramilitaries escalated their strategy by switching from attacks on socialist offices and the homes of socialist leadership figures to the violent occupation of cities. The Fascists met little serious resistance from authorities and proceeded to take over several cities, including Bologna, Bolzano, Cremona, Ferrara, Fiume and Trent. The Fascists attacked the headquarters of socialist and Catholic unions in Cremona and imposed forced Italianization upon the German-speaking population of Trent and Bolzano. After seizing these cities, the Fascists made plans to take Rome.

On 24 October 1922, the Fascist Party held its annual congress in Naples, where Mussolini ordered Blackshirts to take control of public buildings and trains and to converge on three points around Rome. The march would be led by four prominent Fascist leaders representing its different factions: Italo Balbo, a Blackshirt leader; General Emilio De Bono; Michele Bianchi, an ex syndicalist; and Cesare Maria De Vecchi, a monarchist Fascist. Mussolini himself remained in Milan to await the results of the actions. The Fascists managed to seize control of several post offices and trains in northern Italy while the Italian government, led by a left-wing coalition, was internally divided and unable to respond to the Fascist advances. The Italian government had been in a steady state of turmoil, with many governments being created and then being defeated. The Italian government initially took action to prevent the Fascists from entering Rome, but King Victor Emmanuel III of Italy perceived the risk of bloodshed in Rome in response to attempting to disperse the Fascists to be too high. Some political organizations, such as the conservative Italian Nationalist Association, "assured King Victor Emmanuel that their own Sempre Pronti militia was ready to fight the Blackshirts" if they entered Rome, but their offer was never accepted. Victor Emmanuel III decided to appoint Mussolini as Prime Minister of Italy and Mussolini arrived in Rome on 30 October to accept the appointment. Fascist propaganda aggrandized this event, known as "March on Rome", as a "seizure" of power due to Fascists' heroic exploits.

Upon being appointed Prime Minister of Italy, Mussolini had to form a coalition government because the Fascists did not have control over the Italian parliament. The coalition government included a cabinet led by Mussolini and thirteen other ministers, only three of whom were Fascists, while others included representatives from the army and the navy, two Catholic Popolari members, two democratic liberals, one conservative liberal, one social democrat, one Nationalist member and the philosopher Giovanni Gentile. Mussolini's coalition government initially pursued economically liberal policies under the direction of liberal finance minister Alberto De Stefani from the Center Party, including balancing the budget through deep cuts to the civil service. Initially little drastic change in government policy occurred, and repressive police actions against communists and d'Annunzian rebels were limited. At the same time, Mussolini consolidated his control over the National Fascist Party by creating a governing executive for the party, the Grand Council of Fascism, whose agenda he controlled. In addition, the squadristi blackshirt militia was transformed into the state-run MVSN, led by regular army officers. Militant squadristi were initially highly dissatisfied with Mussolini's government and demanded a "Fascist revolution".

In this period, to appease the King of Italy, Mussolini formed a close political alliance between the Italian Fascists and Italy's conservative faction in Parliament, which was led by Luigi Federzoni, a conservative monarchist and nationalist who was a member of the Italian Nationalist Association (ANI). The ANI joined the National Fascist Party in 1923. Because of the merger of the Nationalists with the Fascists, tensions existed between the conservative nationalist and revolutionary syndicalist factions of the movement. The conservative and syndicalist factions of the Fascist movement sought to reconcile their differences, secure unity and promote fascism by taking on the views of each other. Conservative nationalist Fascists promoted fascism as a revolutionary movement to appease the revolutionary syndicalists, while to appease conservative nationalists, the revolutionary syndicalists declared they wanted to secure social stability and ensure economic productivity. This sentiment included most syndicalist Fascists, particularly Edmondo Rossoni, who as secretary-general of the General Confederation of Fascist Syndical Corporations sought "labor's autonomy and class consciousness".

The Fascists began their attempt to entrench Fascism in Italy with the Acerbo Law, which guaranteed a plurality of the seats in parliament to any party or coalition list in an election that received 25% or more of the vote. The Acerbo Law was passed in spite of numerous abstentions from the vote. In the 1924 election, the Fascists, along with moderates and conservatives, formed a coalition candidate list, and through considerable Fascist violence and intimidation, the list won with 66% of the vote, allowing it to receive 403 seats, most of which went to the Fascists. In the aftermath of the election, a crisis and political scandal erupted after Socialist Party deputy Giacomo Matteotti was kidnapped and murdered by a Fascist. The liberals and the leftist minority in parliament walked out in protest in what became known as the Aventine Secession. On 3 January 1925, Mussolini addressed the Fascist-dominated Italian parliament and declared that he was personally responsible for what happened, but he insisted that he had done nothing wrong and proclaimed himself dictator of Italy, assuming full responsibility for the government and announcing the dismissal of parliament. From 1925 to 1929, Fascism steadily became entrenched in power: opposition deputies were denied access to parliament, censorship was introduced and a December 1925 decree made Mussolini solely responsible to the King. Efforts to increase Fascist influence over Italian society accelerated beginning in 1926, with Fascists taking positions in local administration and 30% of all prefects being administered by appointed Fascists by 1929. In 1929, the Fascist regime gained the political support and blessing of the Roman Catholic Church after the regime signed a concordat with the Church, known as the Lateran Treaty, which gave the papacy recognition as a sovereign state (Vatican City) and financial compensation for the seizure of Church lands by the liberal state in the 19th century. Though Fascist propaganda had begun to speak of the new regime as an all-encompassing "totalitarian" state beginning in 1925, the Fascist Party and regime never gained total control over Italy's institutions. King Victor Emmanuel III remained head of state, the armed forces and the judicial system retained considerable autonomy from the Fascist state, Fascist militias were under military control and initially, the economy had relative autonomy as well.

Between 1922 and 1925, Fascism sought to accommodate the Italian Liberal Party, conservatives, and nationalists under Italy's coalition government, where major alterations to its political agenda were made—alterations such as abandoning its previous populism, republicanism, and anticlericalism—and adopting policies of economic liberalism under Alberto De Stefani, a Center Party member who was Italy's Minister of Finance until dismissed by Mussolini after the imposition of a single-party dictatorship in 1925. The Fascist regime also accepted the Roman Catholic Church and the monarchy as institutions in Italy. To appeal to Italian conservatives, Fascism adopted policies such as promoting family values, including the promotion of policies designed to reduce the number of women in the workforce, limiting the woman's role to that of a mother. In an effort to expand Italy's population to facilitate Mussolini's future plans to control the Mediterranean region, the Fascists banned literature on birth control and increased penalties for abortion in 1926, declaring both crimes against the state. Though Fascism adopted a number of positions designed to appeal to reactionaries, the Fascists also sought to maintain Fascism's revolutionary character, with Angelo Oliviero Olivetti saying that "Fascism would like to be conservative, but it will [be] by being revolutionary". The Fascists supported revolutionary action and committed to secure law and order to appeal to both conservatives and syndicalists.

The Fascist regime began to create a corporatist economic system in 1925 with the creation of the Palazzo Vidioni Pact, in which the Italian employers' association Confindustria and Fascist trade unions agreed to recognize each other as the sole representatives of Italy's employers and employees, excluding non-Fascist trade unions. The Fascist regime created a Ministry of Corporations that organized the Italian economy into 22 sectoral corporations, banned all independent trade unions, banned workers' strikes and lock-outs, and in 1927 issued the Charter of Labour, which established workers' rights and duties and created labor tribunals to arbitrate employer-employee disputes. In practice, the sectoral corporations exercised little independence and were largely controlled by the regime, while employee organizations were rarely led by employees themselves, but instead by appointed Fascist party members.

In the 1920s, Fascist Italy pursued an aggressive foreign policy that included an attack on the Greek island of Corfu, aims to expand Italian territory in the Balkans, plans to wage war against Turkey and Yugoslavia, attempts to bring Yugoslavia into civil war by supporting Croat and Macedonian separatists to legitimize Italian intervention, and making Albania a de facto protectorate of Italy (which was achieved through diplomatic means by 1927). In response to revolt in the Italian colony of Libya, Fascist Italy abandoned the previous liberal-era colonial policy of cooperation with local leaders. Instead, claiming that Italians were a superior race to African races and thereby had the right to colonize the "inferior" Africans, it sought to settle 10 to 15 million Italians in Libya. This resulted in an aggressive military campaign against the Libyans, including mass killings, the use of concentration camps, and the forced starvation of thousands of people. Italian authorities committed ethnic cleansing by forcibly expelling 100,000 Bedouin Cyrenaicans, half the population of Cyrenaica in Libya, from land that was slated to be given to Italian settlers.

The March on Rome brought Fascism international attention. One early admirer of the Italian Fascists was Adolf Hitler, who less than a month after the March had begun to model himself and the Nazi Party upon Mussolini and the Fascists. The Nazis, led by Hitler and the German war hero Erich Ludendorff, attempted a "March on Berlin" modeled upon the March on Rome, which resulted in the failed Beer Hall Putsch in Munich in November 1923, where the Nazis briefly captured Bavarian Minister-President Gustav Ritter von Kahr and announced the creation of a new German government to be led by a triumvirate of von Kahr, Hitler, and Ludendorff. The Beer Hall Putsch was crushed by Bavarian police, and Hitler and other leading Nazis were arrested and detained until 1925.

Another early admirer of Italian Fascism was Gyula Gömbös, leader of the Hungarian National Defence Association (known by its acronym MOVE), one of several groups that were known in Hungary as the "right radicals." Gömbös described himself as a "national socialist" and championed radical land reform and "Christian capital" in opposition to "Jewish capital." He also advocated a revanchist foreign policy and in 1923 stated the need for a "march on Budapest". Yugoslavia briefly had a significant fascist movement, the ORJUNA, which supported Yugoslavism, advocated the creation of a corporatist economy, opposed democracy and took part in violent attacks on communists, though it was opposed to the Italian government due to Yugoslav border disputes with Italy. ARJUNA was dissolved in 1929 when the King of Yugoslavia banned political parties and created a royal dictatorship, though ARJUNA supported the King's decision. Amid a political crisis in Spain involving increased strike activity and rising support for anarchism, Spanish army commander Miguel Primo de Rivera engaged in a successful coup against the Spanish government in 1923 and installed himself as a dictator as head of a conservative military junta that dismantled the established party system of government. Upon achieving power, Primo de Rivera sought to resolve the economic crisis by presenting himself as a compromise arbitrator figure between workers and bosses and his regime created a corporatist economic system based on the Italian Fascist model. In Lithuania in 1926, Antanas Smetona rose to power and founded a fascist regime under his Lithuanian Nationalist Union.

International surge of fascism and World War II (1929–1945)

The events of the Great Depression resulted in an international surge of fascism and the creation of several fascist regimes and regimes that adopted fascist policies. What would become the most prominent example of the new fascist regimes was Nazi Germany, under the leadership of Adolf Hitler. With the rise of Hitler and the Nazis to power in 1933, liberal democracy was dissolved in Germany and the Nazis mobilized the country for war, with expansionist territorial aims against several countries. In the 1930s, the Nazis implemented racial laws that deliberately discriminated against, disenfranchised, and persecuted Jews and other racial minority groups. Hungarian fascist Gyula Gömbös rose to power as Prime Minister of Hungary in 1932 and visited Fascist Italy and Nazi Germany to consolidate good relations with the two regimes. He attempted to entrench his Party of National Unity throughout the country, created a youth organization and a political militia with sixty thousand members, promoted social reforms such as a 48-hour workweek in industry, and pursued irredentist claims on Hungary's neighbors. The fascist Iron Guard movement in Romania soared in political support after 1933, gaining representation in the Romanian government and an Iron Guard member assassinated prime minister Ion Duca. The Iron Guard had little in the way of a concrete program and placed more emphasis on ideas of religious and spiritual revival. During the 6 February 1934 crisis, France faced the greatest domestic political turmoil since the Dreyfus Affair when the fascist Francist Movement and multiple far-right movements rioted en masse in Paris against the French government resulting in major political violence. A variety of para-fascist governments that borrowed elements from fascism were also formed during the Great Depression, including in Greece, Lithuania, Poland and Yugoslavia.

Fascism also expanded its influence outside Europe, especially in East Asia, the Middle East and South America. In China, Wang Jingwei's Kai-Tsu p'ai (Reorganization) faction of the Kuomintang (Nationalist Party of China) supported Nazism in the late 1930s. In Japan, a Nazi movement called the Tōhōkai was formed by Seigō Nakano. The Al-Muthanna Club of Iraq was a pan-Arab movement that supported Nazism and exercised its influence in the Iraqi government through cabinet minister Saib Shawkat who formed a paramilitary youth movement. In South America, several mostly short-lived fascist governments and prominent fascist movements were formed during this period. Argentine President General José Félix Uriburu proposed that Argentina be reorganized along corporatist and fascist lines. Peruvian president Luis Miguel Sánchez Cerro founded the Revolutionary Union in 1931 as the state party for his dictatorship. Later, the Revolutionary Union was taken over by Raúl Ferrero Rebagliati, who sought to mobilize mass support for the group's nationalism in a manner akin to fascism and even started a paramilitary Blackshirts arm as a copy of the Italian group, but the Union lost heavily in the 1936 elections and faded into obscurity. In Paraguay in 1940, Paraguayan President General Higinio Morínigo began his rule as a dictator with the support of pro-fascist military officers, appealed to the masses, exiled opposition leaders and only abandoned his pro-fascist policies after the end of World War II. The Brazilian Integralists led by Plínio Salgado claimed as many as 200,000 members, but following coup attempts they faced a crackdown from the Estado Novo government of Getúlio Vargas in 1937. In the 1930s, the National Socialist Movement of Chile gained seats in Chile's parliament and attempted a coup d'état that resulted in the Seguro Obrero massacre of 1938.

Fascist Italy and Nazi Germany pursued territorial expansionist and interventionist foreign policy agendas from the 1930s through the 1940s, culminating in World War II. Mussolini supported irredentist Italian claims over neighboring territories, establishing Italian domination of the Mediterranean Sea, securing Italian access to the Atlantic Ocean, and the creation of Italian spazio vitale ("vital space") in the Mediterranean and Red Sea regions. Hitler supported irredentist German claims overall territories inhabited by ethnic Germans, along with the creation of German Lebensraum ("living space") in Eastern Europe, including territories held by the Soviet Union, that would be colonized by Germans.

From 1935 to 1939, Germany and Italy escalated their demands for territorial gains and greater influence in world affairs. Italy invaded Ethiopia in 1935, resulting in condemnation by the League of Nations and widespread diplomatic isolation. In 1936, Germany remilitarized the industrial Rhineland, a region that had been ordered demilitarized by the Treaty of Versailles. In 1938, Germany annexed Austria and the Sudetenland region of Czechoslovakia. The next year, Czechoslovakia was partitioned between Germany and a client state of Slovakia. At the same time, from 1938 to 1939, Italy was demanding territorial and colonial concessions from France and Britain in the Mediterranean. In 1939, Germany prepared for war with Poland, but also attempted to gain territorial concessions from Poland through diplomatic means. Germany demanded that Poland accept the annexation of the Free City of Danzig to Germany and authorize the construction of automobile highways from Germany through the Polish Corridor into Danzig and East Prussia, promising a twenty-five-year non-aggression pact in exchange. The Polish government did not trust Hitler's promises and refused to accept German demands. Following a strategic alliance between Germany and the Soviet Union in August 1939, the two powers invaded Poland in September of that year.

In response, the United Kingdom, France, and their allies declared war against Germany, resulting in the outbreak of World War II. Germany and the Soviet Union partitioned Poland between them in late 1939 followed by the successful German offensive in Scandinavia and continental Western Europe in 1940. On 10 June 1940, Mussolini led Italy into World War II on the side of the Axis. Mussolini was aware that Italy did not have the military capacity to carry out a long war with France or Britain and waited until France was on the verge of imminent collapse before declaring war, on the assumption that the war would be short-lived. Mussolini believed that Italy could gain some territorial concessions from France and then concentrate its forces on a major offensive in Egypt. Plans by Germany to invade the United Kingdom in 1940 failed after Germany lost the aerial warfare campaign in the Battle of Britain. The war became prolonged contrary to Mussolini's plans, resulting in Italy losing battles on multiple fronts and requiring German assistance. In 1941, the Axis campaign spread to the Soviet Union after Hitler launched Operation Barbarossa. Axis forces at the height of their power controlled almost all of continental Europe, including the occupation of large portions of the Soviet Union. By 1942, Fascist Italy occupied and annexed Dalmatia from Yugoslavia, Corsica and Nice from France and controlled other territories. During World War II, the Axis Powers in Europe led by Nazi Germany participated in the extermination of millions of Jews and others in the genocide known as the Holocaust.

After 1942, Axis forces began to falter. By 1943, after Italy faced multiple military failures, complete reliance and subordination to Germany and an Allied invasion, Mussolini was removed as head of government and arrested by the order of King Victor Emmanuel III. The king proceeded to dismantle the Fascist state and joined the Allies. Mussolini was rescued from arrest by German forces and led the German client state, the Italian Social Republic from 1943 to 1945. Nazi Germany faced multiple losses and steady Soviet and Western Allied offensives from 1943 to 1945.

On 28 April 1945, Mussolini was captured and executed by Italian communist partisans. On 30 April 1945, Hitler committed suicide during the Battle of Berlin between collapsing German forces and Soviet armed forces. Shortly afterward, Germany surrendered and the Nazi regime was dismantled and key Nazi members were arrested to stand trial for crimes against humanity including the Holocaust.

Yugoslavia, Greece and Ethiopia requested the extradition of 1,200 Italian war criminals, but these people never saw anything like the Nuremberg trials since the British government, with the beginning of Cold War, saw in Pietro Badoglio a guarantee of an anti-communist post-war Italy. The repression of memory led to historical revisionism in Italy and in 2003 the Italian media published Silvio Berlusconi's statement that Benito Mussolini only "used to send people on vacation", denying the existence of Italian concentration camps such as Rab concentration camp.

Fascism, neofascism and postfascism after World War II (1945–2008)

In the aftermath of World War II, the victory of the Allies over the Axis powers led to the collapse of multiple fascist regimes in Europe. The Nuremberg Trials convicted multiple Nazi leaders of crimes against humanity including the Holocaust. However, there remained multiple ideologies and governments that were ideologically related to fascism.

Francisco Franco's quasi-fascist Falangist one-party state in Spain was officially neutral during World War II and survived the collapse of the Axis Powers. Franco's rise to power had been directly assisted by the militaries of Fascist Italy and Nazi Germany during the Spanish Civil War and had sent volunteers to fight on the side of Nazi Germany against the Soviet Union during World War II. After World War II and a period of international isolation, Franco's regime normalized relations with Western powers during the early years of the Cold War until Franco's death in 1975 and the transformation of Spain into a liberal democracy.
 
Peronism, which is associated with the regime of Juan Peron in Argentina from 1946 to 1955 and 1973 to 1974, was strongly influenced by fascism. Prior to rising to power, from 1939 to 1941 Peron had developed a deep admiration of Italian Fascism and modelled his economic policies on Italian Fascist economic policies.

The South African government of Afrikaner nationalist and white supremacist Daniel François Malan was closely associated with pro-fascist and pro-Nazi politics. In 1937, Malan's Purified National Party, the South African Fascists and the Blackshirts agreed to form a coalition for the South African election. Malan had fiercely opposed South Africa's participation on the Allied side in World War II. Malan's government founded apartheid, the system of racial segregation of whites and non-whites in South Africa. The most extreme Afrikaner fascist movement is the neo-Nazi white supremacist Afrikaner Resistance Movement (AWB) that at one point was recorded in 1991 to have 50,000 supporters with rising support. The AWB grew in support in response to efforts to dismantle apartheid in the 1980s and early 1990s and its paramilitary wing the Storm Falcons threatened violence against people it considered "trouble makers".

Another ideology strongly influenced by fascism is Ba'athism. Ba'athism is a revolutionary Arab nationalist ideology that seeks the unification of all claimed Arab lands into a single Arab state. Zaki al-Arsuzi, one of the principal founders of Ba'athism, was strongly influenced by and supportive of Fascism and Nazism. Several close associates of Ba'athism's key ideologist Michel Aflaq have admitted that Aflaq had been directly inspired by certain fascist and Nazi theorists. Ba'athist regimes in power in Iraq and Syria have held strong similarities to fascism, they are radical authoritarian nationalist one-party states. Due to Ba'athism's anti-Western stances it preferred the Soviet Union in the Cold War and admired and adopted certain Soviet organizational structures for their governments, but the Ba'athist regimes have persecuted communists. Like fascist regimes, Ba'athism became heavily militarized in power. Ba'athist movements governed Iraq in 1963 and again from 1968 to 2003 and in Syria from 1963 to the present. Ba'athist heads of state such as Syrian President Hafez al-Assad and Iraqi President Saddam Hussein created personality cults around themselves portraying themselves as the nationalist saviours of the Arab world.

Ba'athist Iraq under Saddam Hussein pursued ethnic cleansing or the liquidation of minorities, pursued expansionist wars against Iran and Kuwait and gradually replaced pan-Arabism with an Iraqi nationalism that emphasized Iraq's connection to the glories of ancient Mesopotamian empires, including Babylonia. Historian of fascism Stanley Payne has said about Saddam Hussein's regime: "There will probably never again be a reproduction of the Third Reich, but Saddam Hussein has come closer than any other dictator since 1945".

In the 1990s, Payne claimed that the Hindu nationalist movement Rashtriya Swayamsevak Sangh (RSS) holds strong resemblances to fascism, including its use of paramilitaries and its irredentist claims calling for the creation of a Greater India. Cyprian Blamires in World Fascism: A Historical Encyclopedia describes the ideology of the RSS as "fascism with Sanskrit characters" – a unique Indian variant of fascism. Blamires notes that there is evidence that the RSS held direct contact with Italy's Fascist regime and admired European fascism, a view with some support from A. James Gregor. However, these views have met wide criticism, especially from academics specializing Indian politics. Paul Brass, expert on Hindu-Muslim violence, notes that there are many problems with accepting this point of view and identified four reasons that it is difficult to define the Sangh as fascist. Firstly, most scholars of the field do not subscribe to the view the RSS is fascist, notably among them Christophe Jaffrelot, A. James Gregor and Chetan Bhatt. The other reasons include an absence of charismatic leadership, a desire on the part of the RSS to differentiate itself from European fascism, major cultural differences between the RSS and European fascists and factionalism within the Sangh Parivar. Stanley Payne claims that it also has substantial differences with fascism such as its emphasis on traditional religion as the basis of identity.

Contemporary fascism (2008-present)
Since the Great Recession of 2008, fascism has seen an international surge in popularity, alongside closely associated phenomena like xenophobia, antisemitism, authoritarianism and euroskepticism.

The alt-right—a loosely connected coalition of individuals and organizations which advocates a wide range of far-right ideas, from neoreactionaries to white nationalists—is often included under the umbrella term neo-fascism because alt-right individuals and organizations advocate a radical form of authoritarian ultranationalism. Alt right neofascists often campaign in indirect ways linked to conspiracy theories like "white genocide," pizzagate and QAnon, and seek to question the legitimacy of elections. Groups which are identified as neo-fascist in the United States generally include neo-Nazi organizations and movements such as the Proud Boys, the National Alliance, and the American Nazi Party. The Institute for Historical Review publishes negationist articles of an anti-semitic nature.

Since 2016 and increasingly over the course of the presidency of Donald Trump, scholars have debated whether Trumpism should be considered a form of fascism.

Fascism's relationship with other political and economic ideologies
Mussolini saw fascism as opposing socialism and left-wing ideologies, writing in The Doctrine of Fascism: "If it is admitted that the nineteenth century has been the century of Socialism, Liberalism and Democracy, it does not follow that the twentieth must also be the century of Liberalism, Socialism and Democracy. Political doctrines pass; peoples remain. It is to be expected that this century may be that of authority, a century of the 'Right,' a Fascist century."

Capitalism
Fascism had a complex relationship with capitalism, both supporting and opposing different aspects of it at different times and in different countries. In general, fascists held an instrumental view of capitalism, regarding it as a tool that may be useful or not, depending on circumstances. Fascists aimed to promote what they considered the national interests of their countries; they supported the right to own private property and the profit motive because they believed that they were beneficial to the economic development of a nation, but they commonly sought to eliminate the autonomy of large-scale business interests from the state.

There were both pro-capitalist and anti-capitalist elements in fascist thought. Fascist opposition to capitalism was based on the perceived decadence, hedonism and cosmopolitanism of the wealthy, in contrast to the idealized discipline, patriotism and moral virtue of the members of the middle classes. Fascist support for capitalism was based on the idea that economic competition was good for the nation, as well as social Darwinist beliefs that the economic success of the wealthy proved their superiority and the idea that interfering with natural selection in the economy would burden the nation by preserving weak individuals. These two ways of thinking about capitalism – viewing it as a positive force which promotes economic efficiency and is necessary for the prosperity of the nation but also viewing it as a negative force which promotes decadence and disloyalty to the nation – remained in uneasy coexistence within most fascist movements. The economic policies of fascist governments, meanwhile, were generally not based on ideological commitments one way or the other, instead being dictated by pragmatic concerns with building a strong national economy, promoting autarky, and the need to prepare for and to wage war.

The earliest version of a fascist movement, the small groups led by Benito Mussolini in Italy from 1915 to 1920, formed a radical pro-war movement which focused on Italian territorial expansion and aimed to unite people from across the political spectrum in service to this goal. As such, this movement did not take a clear stance either for or against capitalism, as that would have divided its supporters. Many of its leaders, including Mussolini himself, had come from the anti-capitalist revolutionary syndicalist tradition and were known for their anti-capitalist rhetoric. However, a significant part of the movement's funding came from pro-war business interests and major landowners. Mussolini at this stage tried to maintain a balance, by still claiming to be a social revolutionary while also cultivating a "positive attitude" towards capitalism and capitalists. The small fascist movement that was led by Mussolini in Milan in 1919 bore almost no resemblance with the Italian Fascism of ten years later, as it put forward an ambitious anti-capitalist program calling for redistributing land to the peasants, a progressive tax on capital, greater inheritance taxes and the confiscation of excessive war profits, while also proclaiming its opposition to "any kind of dictatorship or arbitrary power" and demanding an independent judiciary, universal suffrage, and complete freedom of speech. Yet Mussolini at the same time promised to eliminate state intervention in business and to transfer large segments of the economy from public to private control, and the fascists met in a hall provided by Milanese businessmen. These contradictions were regarded by Mussolini as a virtue of the fascist movement, which, at this early stage, intended to appeal to everyone.

Starting in 1921, Italian Fascism shifted from presenting itself as a broad-based expansionist movement, to claiming to represent the extreme right of Italian politics. This was accompanied by a shift in its attitude towards capitalism. Whereas in the beginning it had accommodated both anti-capitalist and pro-capitalist stances, it now took on a strongly pro-free-enterprise policy. After being elected to the Italian parliament for the first time, the Fascists took a stand against economic collectivization and nationalization, and advocated for the privatization of postal and railway services. Mussolini appealed to conservative liberals to support a future fascist seizure of power by arguing that "capitalism would flourish best if Italy discarded democracy and accepted dictatorship as necessary in order to crush socialism and make government effective." He also promised that the fascists would reduce taxes and balance the budget, repudiated his socialist past and affirmed his faith in economic liberalism.

In 1922, following the March on Rome, the National Fascist Party came to power and Mussolini became prime minister of Italy. From that time until the advent of the Great Depression in 1929, the Italian Fascists pursued a generally free-market and pro-capitalist economic policy, in collaboration with traditional Italian business elites. Near the beginning of his tenure as prime minister, in 1923, Mussolini declared that "the [Fascist] government will accord full freedom to private enterprise and will abandon all intervention in private economy." Mussolini's government privatized former government monopolies (such as the telephone system), repealed previous legislation that had been introduced by the Socialists (such as the inheritance tax), and balanced the budget. Alfredo Rocco, the Fascist Minister of Justice at the time, wrote in 1926 that:

Mussolini attracted the wealthy in the 1920s by praising free enterprise, by talking about reducing the bureaucracy and abolishing unemployment relief, and by supporting increased inequality in society. He advocated economic liberalization, asserted that the state should keep out of the economy and even said that government intervention in general was "absolutely ruinous to the development of the economy." At the same time, however, he also tried to maintain some of fascism's early appeal to people of all classes by insisting that he was not against the workers, and sometimes by outright contradicting himself and saying different things to different audiences. Many of the wealthy Italian industrialists and landlords backed Mussolini because he provided stability (especially compared to the Giolitti era), and because under Mussolini's government there were "few strikes, plenty of tax concessions for the well-to-do, an end to rent controls and generally high profits for business."

The Italian Fascist outlook towards capitalism changed after 1929, with the onset of the Great Depression which dealt a heavy blow to the Italian economy. Prices fell, production slowed, and unemployment more than tripled in the first four years of the Depression. In response, the Fascist government abandoned economic liberalism and turned to state intervention in the economy. Mussolini developed a theory which held that capitalism had degenerated over time, and that the capitalism of his era was facing a crisis because it had departed too far from its original roots. According to Mussolini, the original form was heroic capitalism or dynamic capitalism (1830–1870), which gave way to static capitalism (1870–1914), which then transformed into decadent capitalism or "supercapitalism", starting in 1914. Mussolini denounced this supercapitalism as a failure due to its alleged decadence, support for unlimited consumerism and intention to create the "standardization of humankind". He claimed that supercapitalism had resulted in the collapse of the capitalist system in the Great Depression, but that the industrial developments of earlier types of capitalism were valuable and that private property should be supported as long as it was productive. Fascists also argued that, without intervention, supercapitalism "would ultimately decay and open the way for a Marxist revolution as labour-capital relations broke down". They presented their new economic program as a way to avoid this result.

The idea of corporatism, which had already been part of Fascist rhetoric for some time, rose to prominence as a solution that would preserve private enterprise and property while allowing the state to intervene in the economy when private enterprise failed. Corporatism was promoted as reconciling the interests of capital and labour. Mussolini argued that this fascist corporatism would preserve those elements of capitalism that were deemed beneficial, such as private enterprise, and combine them with state supervision. At this time he also said that he rejected the typical capitalist elements of economic individualism and laissez-faire. Mussolini claimed that in supercapitalism "a capitalist enterprise, when difficulties arise, throws itself like a dead weight into the state's arms. It is then that state intervention begins and becomes more necessary. It is then that those who once ignored the state now seek it out anxiously". Due to the inability of businesses to operate properly when facing economic difficulties, Mussolini claimed that this proved that state intervention into the economy was necessary to stabilize the economy.

Statements from Italian Fascist leaders in the 1930s tended to be critical of economic liberalism and laissez-faire, while promoting corporatism as the basis for a new economic model. Mussolini said in an interview in October 1933 that he "want[ed] to establish the corporative regime," and in a speech on 14 November 1933 he declared:

A year later, in 1934, Italian Agriculture Minister Giacomo Acerbo claimed that Fascist corporatism was the best way to defend private property in the context of the Great Depression:

In the late 1930s, Fascist Italy tried to achieve autarky (national economic self-sufficiency), and for this purpose the government promoted manufacturing cartels and introduced significant tariff barriers, currency restrictions and regulations of the economy to attempt to balance payments with Italy's trade partners. The attempt to achieve effective economic autonomy was not successful, but minimizing international trade remained an official goal of Italian Fascism.

German Nazism, like Italian Fascism, also incorporated both pro-capitalist and anti-capitalist views. The main difference was that Nazism interpreted everything through a racial lens. Thus, Nazi views on capitalism were shaped by the question of which race the capitalists belonged to. Jewish capitalists (especially bankers) were considered to be mortal enemies of Germany and part of a global conspiracy that also included Jewish communists. On the other hand, ethnic German capitalists were regarded as potential allies by the Nazis.

From the beginning of the Nazi movement, and especially from the late 1920s onward, the Nazi Party took the stance that it was not opposed to private property or capitalism as such, but only to its excesses and the domination of the German economy by "foreign" capitalists (including German Jews). There were a range of economic views within the early Nazi Party, ranging from the Strasserite wing which championed extensive state intervention, to the Völkisch conservatives who promoted a program of conservative corporatism, to the economic right-wing within Nazism, who hoped to avoid corporatism because it was viewed as too restrictive for big business. In the end, the approach that prevailed after the Nazis came to power was a pragmatic one, in which there would be no new economic system, but rather a continuation of "the long German tradition of authoritarian statist economics, which dated well back into the nineteenth century."

Like Fascist Italy, Nazi Germany similarly pursued an economic agenda with the aims of autarky and rearmament and imposed protectionist policies, including forcing the German steel industry to use lower-quality German iron ore rather than superior-quality imported iron. The Nazis were economic nationalists who "favoured protective tariffs, foreign debt reduction, and import substitution to remove what they regarded as debilitating dependence on the world economy."

The purpose of the economy, according to the Nazi worldview, was to "provide the material springboard for military conquest." As such, the Nazis aimed to place the focus of the German economy on a drive for empire and conquest, and they found and promoted businessmen who were willing to cooperate with their goals. They opposed free-market economics and instead promoted a state-driven economy that would guarantee high profits to friendly private companies in exchange for their support, which was a model adopted by many other political movements and governments in the 1930s, including the governments of Britain and France. Private capitalism was not directly challenged, but it was subordinated to the military and foreign policy goals of the state, in a way that reduced the decision-making power of industrial managers but did not interfere with the pursuit of private profit. Leading German business interests supported the goals of the Nazi government and its war effort in exchange for advantageous contracts, subsidies, and the suppression of the trade union movement. Avraham Barkai concludes that, because "the individual firm still operated according to the principle of maximum profit," the Nazi German economy was therefore "a capitalist economy in which capitalists, like all other citizens, were not free even though they enjoyed a privileged status, had a limited measure of freedom in their activities, and were able to accumulate huge profits as long as they accepted the primacy of politics."

Other fascist movements mirrored the general outlook of the Italian Fascists and German Nazis. The Spanish Falange called for respect for private property and was founded with support from Spanish landowners and industrialists. However, the Falange distinguished between "private property", which it supported, and "capitalism", which it opposed. The Falangist program of 1937 recognized "private property as a legitimate means for achieving individual, family and social goals," but Falangist leader José Antonio Primo de Rivera said in 1935: "We reject the capitalist system, which disregards the needs of the people, dehumanizes private property and transforms the workers into shapeless masses prone to misery and despair." After his death and the rise of Francisco Franco, the rhetoric changed, and Falangist leader Raimundo Fernández-Cuesta declared the movement's ideology to be compatible with capitalism. In Hungary, the Arrow Cross Party held anti-feudal, anti-capitalist and anti-socialist beliefs, supporting land reform and militarism and drawing most of its support from the ranks of the army.  The Romanian Iron Guard espoused anti-capitalist, anti-banking and anti-bourgeois rhetoric, combined with anti-communism and a religious form of anti-Semitism. The Iron Guard saw both capitalism and communism as being Jewish creations that served to divide the nation, and accused Jews of being "the enemies of the Christian nation."

Conservatism
Conservatives and fascists in Europe have held similar positions on many issues, including anti-communism and support of national pride. Conservatives and fascists both reject the liberal and Marxist emphasis on linear progressive evolution in history. Fascism's emphasis on order, discipline, hierarchy, military virtues and preservation of private property appealed to conservatives. The fascist promotion of "healthy", "uncontaminated" elements of national tradition such as chivalric culture and glorifying a nation's historical golden age has similarities with conservative aims. Fascists also made pragmatic tactical alliances with traditional conservative forces to achieve and maintain power. Even at the height of their influence and popularity, fascist movements were never able to seize power entirely by themselves, and relied on alliances with conservative parties to come to power. However, while conservatives made alliances with fascists in countries where the conservatives felt themselves under threat and therefore in need of such an alliance, this did not happen in places where the conservatives were securely in power. Several authoritarian conservative regimes across Europe suppressed fascist parties in the 1930s and 40s.

Many of fascism's recruits were disaffected right-wing conservatives who were dissatisfied with the traditional right's inability to achieve national unity and its inability to respond to socialism, feminism, economic crisis and international difficulties. With traditional conservative parties in Europe severely weakened in the aftermath of World War I, there was a political vacuum on the right which fascism filled. Fascists gathered support from landlords, business owners, army officers, and other conservative individuals and groups, by successfully presenting themselves as the last line of defense against land reform, social welfare measures, demilitarization, higher wages, and the socialization of the means of production.

However, unlike conservatism, fascism specifically presents itself as a modern ideology that is willing to break free from the moral and political constraints of traditional society. The conservative authoritarian right is distinguished from fascism in that such conservatives tended to use traditional religion as the basis for their philosophical views, while fascists based their views on vitalism, nonrationalism, or secular neo-idealism. Fascists often drew upon religious imagery, but used it as a symbol for the nation and replaced spirituality with secular nationalism. Even in the most religious of the fascist movements, the Romanian Iron Guard, "Christ was stripped of genuine otherworldly mystery and was reduced to a metaphor for national redemption." Fascists claimed to support the traditional religions of their countries, but did not regard religion as a source of important moral principles, seeing it only as an aspect of national culture and a source of national identity and pride. Furthermore, while conservatives in interwar Europe generally wished to return to the pre-1914 status quo, fascists did not. Fascism combined an idealization of the past with an enthusiasm for modern technology. Nazi Germany "celebrated Aryan values and the glories of the Germanic knights while also taking pride in its newly created motorway system." Fascists looked to the spirit of the past to inspire a new era of national greatness and set out to "forge a mythic link between the present generation and a glorious stage in the past", but they did not seek to directly copy or restore past societies.

Another difference with traditional conservatism lies in the fact that fascism had radical aspirations for reshaping society. Arthur M. Schlesinger Jr. wrote that "Fascists were not conservative in any very meaningful sense… The Fascists, in a meaningful sense, were revolutionaries". Fascists sought to destroy existing elites through revolutionary action to replace them with a new elite selected on the principle of the survival of the fittest, and thus they "rejected existing aristocracies in favor of their own new aristocracy." Yet at the same time, some fascist leaders claimed to be counter-revolutionary, and fascism saw itself as being opposed to all previous revolutions from the French Revolution onward, blaming them for liberalism, socialism, and decadence. In his book Fascism (1997), Mark Neocleous sums up these paradoxical tendencies by referring to fascism as "a prime example of reactionary modernism" as well as "the culmination of the conservative revolutionary tradition."

Liberalism
Fascism is strongly opposed to the individualism found in classical liberalism. Fascists accuse liberalism of de-spiritualizing human beings and transforming them into materialistic beings whose highest ideal is moneymaking. In particular, fascism opposes liberalism for its materialism, rationalism, individualism and utilitarianism. Fascists believe that the liberal emphasis on individual freedom produces national divisiveness. Mussolini criticized classical liberalism for its individualistic nature, writing: "Against individualism, the Fascist conception is for the State; ... It is opposed to classical Liberalism ... Liberalism denied the State in the interests of the particular individual; Fascism reaffirms the State as the true reality of the individual." However, Fascists and Nazis support a type of hierarchical individualism in the form of Social Darwinism because they believe it promotes "superior individuals" and weeds out "the weak". They also accuse both Marxism and democracy, with their emphasis on equality, of destroying individuality in favor of the "dead weight" of the masses.

One issue where Fascism is in accord with liberalism is in its support of private property rights and the existence of a market economy. Although Fascism sought to "destroy the existing political order", it had tentatively adopted the economic elements of liberalism, but "completely denied its philosophical principles and the intellectual and moral heritage of modernity". Fascism espoused antimaterialism, which meant that it rejected the "rationalistic, individualistic and utilitarian heritage" that defined the liberal-centric Age of Enlightenment. Nevertheless, between the two pillars of fascist economic policy – national syndicalism and productionism – it was the latter that was given more importance, so the goal of creating a less materialist society was generally not accomplished.

Fascists saw contemporary politics as a life or death struggle of their nations against Marxism, and they believed that liberalism weakened their nations in this struggle and left them defenseless. While the socialist left was seen by the fascists as their main enemy, liberals were seen as the enemy's accomplices, "incompetent guardians of the nation against the class warfare waged by the socialists."

Social welfare and public works
Fascists opposed social welfare for those they regarded as weak and decadent, but supported state assistance for those they regarded as strong and pure. As such, fascist movements criticized the welfare policies of the democratic governments they opposed, but eventually adopted welfare policies of their own to gain popular support. The Nazis condemned indiscriminate social welfare and charity, whether run by the state or by private entities, because they saw it as "supporting many people who were racially inferior." After coming to power, they adopted a type of selective welfare system that would only help those who were biologically and racially valuable. Italian Fascism had changing attitudes towards welfare, taking a stance against unemployment benefits upon coming to power in 1922, but later arguing that improving the well-being of the labor force could serve the national interest by increasing productive potential, and adopting welfare measures on this basis.

From 1925 to 1939, the Italian Fascist government "embarked upon an elaborate program" of social welfare provision, supplemented by private charity from wealthy industrialists "in the spirit of Fascist class collaboration." This program included food supplementary assistance, infant care, maternity assistance, family allowances per child to encourage higher birth rates, paid vacations, public housing, and insurance for unemployment, occupational diseases, old age and disability. Many of these were continuations of programs already begun under the parliamentary system that fascism had replaced, and they were similar to programs instituted by democratic governments across Europe and North America in the same time period. Social welfare under democratic governments was sometimes more generous, but given that Italy was a poorer country, its efforts were more ambitious, and its legislation "compared favorably with the more advanced European nations and in some respects was more progressive."

Out of a "determination to make Italy the powerful, modern state of his imagination," Mussolini also began a broad campaign of public works after 1925, such that "bridges, canals, and roads were built, hospitals and schools, railway stations and orphanages; swamps were drained and land reclaimed, forests were planted and universities were endowed". The Mussolini administration "devoted 400 million lire of public monies" for school construction between 1922 and 1942, compared to only 60 million lire between 1862 and 1922. Extensive archaeological works were also financed, with the intention of highlighting the legacy of the Roman Empire, and clearing ancient monuments of "everything that has grown up round them during the centuries of decadence."

In Germany, the Nazi Party condemned the welfare system of the Weimar Republic, together with private charity and philanthropy, as being "evils that had to be eliminated if the German race was to be strengthened and its weakest elements weeded out in the process of natural selection." Once in power, the Nazis drew sharp distinctions between those undeserving and those deserving of assistance, and strove to direct all public and private aid towards the latter. They argued that this approach represented "racial self-help" and not indiscriminate charity or universal social welfare.

An organization called National Socialist People's Welfare (Nationalsozialistische Volkswohlfahrt, NSV) was given the task of taking over the functions of social welfare institutions and "coordinating" the private charities, which had previously been run mainly by the churches and by the labour movement. Hitler instructed NSV chairman Erich Hilgenfeldt to "see to the disbanding of all private welfare institutions," in an effort to direct who was to receive social benefits. Welfare benefits were abruptly withdrawn from Jews, Communists, many Social Democrats, Jehovah's Witnesses, and others that were considered enemies of the Nazi regime, at first without any legal justification.

The NSV officially defined its mandate very broadly. For instance, one of the NSV branches, the Office of Institutional and Special Welfare, was responsible "for travellers' aid at railway stations; relief for ex-convicts; 'support' for re-migrants from abroad; assistance for the physically disabled, hard-of-hearing, deaf, mute, and blind; relief for the elderly, homeless and alcoholics; and the fight against illicit drugs and epidemics". But the NSV also explicitly stated that all such benefits would only be available to "racially superior" persons. NSV administrators were able to mount an effort towards the "cleansing of their cities of 'asocials'," who were deemed unworthy of receiving assistance for various reasons.

The NSV limited its assistance to those who were "racially sound, capable of and willing to work, politically reliable, and willing and able to reproduce," and excluded non-Aryans, the "work-shy", "asocials" and the "hereditarily ill." The agency successfully "projected a powerful image of caring and support" for "those who were judged to have got into difficulties through no fault of their own," as over 17 million Germans had obtained assistance from the NSV by 1939. However, the organization also resorted to intrusive questioning and monitoring to judge who was worthy of support, and for this reason it was "feared and disliked among society's poorest."

Socialism and communism
Fascism is historically strongly opposed to socialism and communism, due to their support of class revolution as well as "decadent" values, including internationalism, egalitarianism, horizontal collectivism, materialism and cosmopolitanism. Fascists have thus commonly campaigned with anti-communist agendas. Fascists saw themselves as building a new aristocracy, a "warrior race or nation", based on purity of blood, heroism and virility. They strongly opposed ideas of universal human equality and advocated hierarchy in its place, adhering to "the Aristotelian conviction, amplified by the modern elite theorists, that the human race is divided by nature into sheep and shepherds." Fascists believed in the survival of the fittest, and argued that society should be led by an elite of "the fittest, the strongest, the most heroic, the most productive, and, even more than that, those most fervently possessed with the national idea."

Marxism and fascism oppose each other primarily because Marxism "called on the workers of the world to unite across national borders in a global battle against their oppressors, treating nation-states and national pride as tools in the arsenal of bourgeois propaganda", while fascism, on the contrary, exalted the interests of the nation or race as the highest good, and rejected all ideas of universal human interests standing above the nation or race. Within the nation, Marxism calls for class struggle by the working class against the ruling class, while fascism calls for collaboration between the classes to achieve national rejuvenation. Fascism proposes a type of society in which different classes continue to exist, but the rich and poor both serve the national interest and do not oppose each other.

Following the Bolshevik revolution of 1917 and the creation of the Soviet Union, fear of and opposition to communism became a major aspect of European politics in the 1920s and 1930s. Fascists were able to take advantage of this and presented themselves as the political force most capable of defeating communism. This was a major factor in enabling fascists to make alliances with the old establishment and to come to power in Italy and Germany, in spite of fascism's own radical agenda, because of the shared anti-Marxism of fascists and conservatives. The Nazis in particular came to power "on the back of a powerfully anticommunist program and in an atmosphere of widespread fear of a Bolshevik revolution at home," and their first concentration camps in 1933 were meant for holding socialist and communist political prisoners. Both Fascist Italy and Nazi Germany also suppressed independent working-class organizations.

Fascism opposed the internationalist character of mainstream socialism, but in doing so, it sometimes defined itself as a new, nationalist form of socialism, an alternative to the mainstream form of socialism which it regarded as its bitter enemy. Hitler at times attempted to redefine the word socialism, such as saying: "Socialism! That is an unfortunate word altogether... What does socialism really mean? If people have something to eat and their pleasures, then they have their socialism". In 1930, Hitler said: "Our adopted term 'Socialist' has nothing to do with Marxist Socialism. Marxism is anti-property; true Socialism is not". The name that Hitler later wished he had used to describe his political party was "social revolutionary".

Mainstream socialists have typically rejected and opposed fascism in turn. Many communists regarded fascism as a tool of the ruling-class to destroy the working-class, regarding it as "the open but indirect dictatorship of capital." Nikita Khrushchev sardonically remarked: "In modern times the word Socialism has become very fashionable, and it has also been used very loosely. Even Hitler used to babble about Socialism, and he worked the word into the name of his Nazi [National Socialist] party. The whole world knows what sort of Socialism Hitler had in mind".

However, the agency and genuine belief of fascists was recognised by some communist writers, like Antonio Gramsci, Palmiro Togliatti and Otto Bauer, who instead believed fascism to be a genuine mass movement that arose as a consequence of the specific socio-economic conditions of the societies it arose in. Despite the mutual antagonism that would later develop between the two, the attitude of communists towards early fascism was more ambivalent than it might appear from the writings of individual communist theorists. In the early days, Fascism was sometimes perceived as less of a mortal rival to revolutionary Marxism than as a heresy from it. Mussolini's government was one of the first in Western Europe to diplomatically recognise the USSR, doing so in 1924. On 20 June 1923, Karl Radek gave a speech before the Comintern in which he proposed a common front with the Nazis in Germany. However, the two radicalisms were mutually exclusive and they later become profound enemies.

While fascism is opposed to Bolshevism, both Bolshevism and fascism promote the one-party state and the use of political party militias. Fascists and communists also agree on the need for violent revolution to forge a new era, and they hold common positions in their opposition to liberalism, capitalism, individualism and parliamentarism.

Fascism denounces democratic socialism as a failure. Fascists see themselves as supporting a moral and spiritual renewal based on a warlike spirit of violence and heroism, and they condemn democratic socialism for advocating "humanistic lachrimosity" such as natural rights, justice, and equality. Fascists also oppose democratic socialism for its support of reformism and the parliamentary system that fascism typically rejects.

Italian Fascism had ideological connections with revolutionary syndicalism, in particular Sorelian syndicalism. Benito Mussolini mentioned revolutionary syndicalist Georges Sorel—along with Hubert Lagardelle and his journal Le Mouvement socialiste, which advocated a technocratic vision of society—as major influences on fascism. According to Zeev Sternhell, World War I caused Italian revolutionary syndicalism to develop into a national syndicalism reuniting all social classes, which later transitioned into Italian Fascism, such that "most syndicalist leaders were among the founders of the Fascist movement" and "many even held key posts" in the Italian Fascist regime by the mid-1920s.

The Sorelian emphasis on the need for a revolution based upon action of intuition, a cult of energy and vitality, activism, heroism and the use of myth was used by fascists. Many prominent fascist figures were formerly associated with revolutionary syndicalism, including Mussolini, Arturo Labriola, Robert Michels and Paolo Orano.

See also
Fascist (insult)
Clerical fascism
Definitions of fascism
"The Doctrine of Fascism"
Ecofascism
Economics of fascism
Fascio
Fascist socialization
Fascist symbolism
Fascist Syndicalism
Ideology of the Committee of Union and Progress
Producerism
Yellow socialism

References

General bibliography
 
 
 
 
 
 
 
 
 
 
 
 
 
 
 
 
 
 
 
 
 
 
 
 
 
 
 
 
 
 
 . online; covers 1908 to 1925.

Bibliography on fascist ideology

Bibliography on international fascism
 
 
 
 
  (Contains chapters on fascist movements in different countries.)

Further reading
Seldes, George. 1935. Sawdust Caesar: The Untold History of Mussolini and Fascism. New York and London: Harper and Brothers.
Reich, Wilhelm. 1970. The Mass Psychology of Fascism. New York: Farrar, Straus & Giroux.

Black, Edwin. 2001. IBM and the Holocaust: The Strategic Alliance between Nazi Germany and America's Most Powerful Corporation Crown.

External links

The Doctrine of Fascism signed by Benito Mussolini (complete text)
Authorized translation of Mussolini's "The Political and Social Doctrine of Fascism" (1933)
The Political Economy of Fascism – From Dave Renton's anti-fascist website
Fascism and Zionism – From The Hagshama Department – World Zionist Organization
Fascism Part I – Understanding Fascism and Anti-Semitism
Eternal Fascism: Fourteen Ways of Looking at a Blackshirt – Umberto Eco's list of 14 characteristics of Fascism, originally published 1995.
Site of an Italian fascist party Italian and German languages
Site dedicated to the period of fascism in Greece (1936–1941)
Text of the papal encyclical Quadragesimo Anno.
Profits über Alles! American Corporations and Hitler by Jacques R. Pauwels

Fascism
Ideologies